Kollektivizator is a rural locality (a selo) in Kraynovsky Selsoviet, Kizlyarsky District, Republic of Dagestan, Russia. The population was 364 as of 2010. There are 3 streets.

Geography 
Kollektivizator is located 64 km northeast of Kizlyar (the district's administrative centre) by road. Kraynovka and Imeni Magomeda Gadzhiyeva are the nearest rural localities.

Nationalities 
Avars, Russians and Dargins live there.

References 

Rural localities in Kizlyarsky District